On Again! On Again! is the fourth studio album by Jake Thackray. It was produced by Norman Newell and released on LP by EMI in 1977. The album is currently out of print, but its songs, digitally remastered, are included in the four-CD retrospective Jake in a Box.

It includes two English-language adaptations of songs by the French singer Georges Brassens: "Isabella" (adapted from Brassens' "Marinette"), and "Over to Isobel" (adapted from Brassens' "Je Rejoindrai Ma Belle").

Track listing

Personnel
Jake Thackray - vocals, guitar
Dick Abell - guitar
Alan Williams - bass

External links
Track listing at jakethackray.com

Jake Thackray albums
1977 albums
Albums produced by Norman Newell
EMI Records albums